The 1907 FA Cup final was contested by The Wednesday and Everton at Crystal Palace. Sheffield Wednesday won 2–1, with goals by Jimmy Stewart and George Simpson.

This was the second time that the previous winner had reached the final and failed to win it, the first time being in 1883 when Old Etonians lost to Blackburn Olympic.

Match details

Road to the Final

References

External links
 Line-ups
 Match report at www.fa-cupfinals.co.uk

1907
FA Cup
Fa Cup Final 1907
Fa Cup Final 1907
FA Cup Final
FA Cup Final